John "Jack" Young (20 October 1887 – 9 February 1965) was an Irish Gaelic footballer who played as a midfielder at senior level for the Cork county team.

Young made his first appearance for the team during the 1911 championship and was a regular member of the starting fifteen for just two championship seasons. During that time he won a set of All-Ireland and Munster winners' medals. 

At club level Young began his career with Doheny's before later winning two county championship medals with Nils in Cork city. He also played hurling with the St Finbarr's club. 

Young was the patriarch of a famous Gaelic games family in Cork. His sons, Éamonn and Jim, were All-Ireland medalists in football and hurling respectively.

References

1887 births
1965 deaths
Cork inter-county Gaelic footballers
Dohenys Gaelic footballers
Nils Gaelic footballers
St Finbarr's hurlers
Winners of one All-Ireland medal (Gaelic football)